Blagoja "Billy" Celeski (born 14 July 1985) is a retired Macedonian-born Australian footballer. He last played as a midfielder for Ventforet Kofu in the J1 League in 2016.

Club career
Celeski signed for Perth Glory for the 2005–06 A-League season from Bullen Zebras playing 18 times and won the club's media award, but was released at the end of the season. Celeski graduated from the Victorian Institute of Sport and Australian Institute of Sport. In March 2007 Celeski was signed by Perth Glory again. A notable performance, with Perth Glory, in the A-League occurred on Saturday, 15 December 2007 – where Celeski scored a hat-trick in Perth Glory's 4–2 win over Sydney FC at the Sydney Football Stadium.

Afterwards Celeski signed for Melbourne Victory at the end of the 2007–08 season in a one-year deal, post-mutual termination of his Perth Glory contract, primarily to bolster the squad for the AFC Champions League. Celeski scored his first goal for his new club in their 3–2 win over Adelaide United on 31 October 2008. Celeski signed a new 2-year contract with Melbourne Victory on 23 December 2008.

Celeski went on to play a role in the Melbourne team, performing an important role in their title-winning campaign, while also not missing a league match until late 2009. This was to be stopped on 3 September of that year however, when he suffered a season ending anterior cruciate ligament injury, in the opening of a match against Newcastle Jets.

On 20 July 2013, Celeski represented the A-League All Stars in the inaugural A-League All Stars Game against Manchester United, a match in which the A-League All Stars were thrashed 5–1, courtesy of goals from Danny Welbeck, Jesse Lingard and Robin van Persie. Just 4 days later, on 24 July 2013, he represented Melbourne Victory against Liverpool, a match in which the Victory lost 2–0, courtesy of goals from Steven Gerrard and an own-goal from Victory captain Adrian Leijer. He was the only Victory player to have played in both of those exhibition matches.

On 30 July 2013, just a few days after representing the A-League All Stars against Manchester United and representing Melbourne Victory against Liverpool, Billy Celeski transferred from Melbourne Victory to UAE Pro-League club Al-Shaab.

On 24 February 2014, Celeski transferred to Chinese Super League side Liaoning Whowin. On 29 May 2014, he was released along with Artyom Filiposyan.

On 6 August 2014, Celeski signed with the Newcastle Jets. He was reportedly sacked by Jets owner Nathan Tinkler, following a player revolt midway through the season.

On 3 February 2016, Celeski joined J1 League club Ventforet Kofu.

International career
Celeski made his first senior international debut for the Socceroos on 28 January 2009 in an AFC Asian Cup qualifying match versus Indonesia, appearing as a substitute for Tom Pondeljak.  He was also a member of the unsuccessful Olyroos squad that took part in the 2008 Beijing Olympics.

Personal life
Celeski was born in Ohrid, SR Macedonia, and moved to Melbourne, Australia as a child.

Honours

Club
Melbourne Victory:
 A-League Championship: 2008–09
 A-League Premiership: 2008–09

Individual
 A-League All Star: 2013

References

External links
Billy Celeski at Aussie Footballers
Billy Celeski at vicfootball

 Melbourne Victory profile
 FFA – Olyroos profile

1985 births
A-League Men players
Living people
Sportspeople from Ohrid
Australian people of Macedonian descent
Australian soccer players
Perth Glory FC players
Whittlesea Zebras players
Macedonian emigrants to Australia
Melbourne Victory FC players
Al-Shaab CSC players
Liaoning F.C. players
Newcastle Jets FC players
J1 League players
Ventforet Kofu players
Olympic soccer players of Australia
Footballers at the 2008 Summer Olympics
Australia international soccer players
Victorian Institute of Sport alumni
Expatriate footballers in China
Chinese Super League players
Association football midfielders
UAE Pro League players
Soccer players from Melbourne